Toulgarctia luteoradians is a moth in the family Erebidae. It was described by Hervé de Toulgoët in 1954. It is found on Madagascar.

Subspecies
Toulgarctia luteoradians luteoradians
Toulgarctia luteoradians jugicola (Toulgoët, 1976)
Toulgarctia luteoradians monochroma (Toulgoët, 1984)

References

Moths described in 1954
Spilosomina